The Black Tux is a men's fashion company specializing in the online tuxedo and suit rental industry. The Black Tux rents tuxedos, suits, and other men’s formalwear accessories entirely through its own e-commerce marketplace.

History 
The company was founded in the year 2012 by Andrew Blackmon and Patrick Coyne, and is headquartered in Santa Monica, California. The business was created as a direct response to the co-founders’ poor experiences involving tuxedo and suit rentals for weddings and formal events. Prior to launching publicly, the company was involved with MuckerLab a Los Angeles-based start-up accelerator. The company received $10 million in Series A funding in January 2015, with an additional $25 million in September 2015.

Business model 
The Black Tux rents tuxedos, suits, and other formalwear and accessories entirely online. Shipping is free both ways and arrives at least a full week prior to customers’ events. The Black Tux designs its tuxedos and suit and offers dress shirts, shoes, neckwear, and other formal wear accessories for rental.

Reception 
Shortly after launching out of beta, The Black Tux was featured in GQ, which called the company “the Warby Parker of the formalwear game” and declared “The Black Tux has come to rescue guys from tux-rental hell.” Since launching they have been featured in The Wall Street Journal, Bloomberg, and Techcrunch. In December 2013, The Black Tux raised funding from investors in the venture capital community.

References 

Companies based in California
Clothing companies of the United States
Companies based in Santa Monica, California
American companies established in 2012
Retail companies established in 2012
Internet properties established in 2012
Clothing rental companies